Shady Grove is an unincorporated community in Houston County, Texas. It is located at the intersection of Farm to Market Road 232, US Highway 287 and County Road 4150, about 10 miles from Crockett.

History 
Shady Grove was settled around the 1850s.  It soon got a post office, but closed in 1866. Two Baptist churches were built in the 1860s and the 1890s where they still stand. In the 1930s, the churches, a cemetery and a few houses were in the area. World War II caused most of the residents to move away although a few residents remained. By the 1990s it was all but abandoned.
The earliest burial in Old Shady Grove Cemetery was for John Hallmark in 1840. The first settlers were in the area as early as 1835 and John and his son, George Hallmark, signed the Petition for Houston County in 1837.

Education 
Most students in Shady Grove attend the Crockett Independent School District. The west side of County Road 4150 is in the Lovelady Independent School District.

Cemetery 
In 2013, there was an effort to preserve the cemetery in the area. It started in 2012 when families in the area and students from nearby Stephen F. Austin State University helped to clean up and discovered unknown grave sites. It was later deemed a Historical Texas Cemetery by the Texas Historical Commission.

The original cemetery is known as the Old Shady Grove Cemetery which began in 1840 and was on the property of E. B. Eakin. Fielding H. Bayne later donated the two-acre tract to Houston County for the church, school and "graveyard". In later years, a new Shady Grove Cemetery was started as it was hard to access the old cemetery as one had to cross a creek to get to there. The newer Shady Grove Cemetery is on Hwy 287.

References

Unincorporated communities in Houston County, Texas
Unincorporated communities in Texas